Buddleja skutchii is endemic to much of the sierras of Central America, growing mostly in pine-oak forest, also in cloud forest, and in shrubby secondary growth.  The species was first named and described by Morton in 1935.

Description
Buddleja skutchii is a dioecious tree 5 – 25 m tall, with brown to blackish fissured bark. The young branches are quadrangular and tomentose, bearing lanceolate to ovate-lanceolate leaves 6 – 20 cm long by 2 – 10 cm wide, membranaceous to subcoriaceous, glabrescent above, below with adpressed indumentum, the margins entire.  The yellow to orange paniculate leafy-bracted inflorescences are 8 – 15 cm long by 8 – 20 cm wide, comprising 3 – 4 orders of branches bearing small cymules 0.4 – 0.6 cm in diameter, each with 3 – 15 flowers. Ploidy: 2n = 76.

Cultivation
The species is grown at the Strybing Arboretum and Golden Gate Park in San Francisco and in France at Le Jardin de Rochevieille .

Subspecies
Two subspecies have been identified by Norman:
Buddleja skutchii C. V. Morton subsp. skutchii E. M. Norman (syn. Buddleja matudae Standl.)
Buddleja skutchii C. V. Morton subsp. costaricensis E. M. Norman

References

skutchii
Flora of Costa Rica
Flora of El Salvador
Flora of Guatemala
Flora of Mexico
Flora of Panama
Flora of Central America
Dioecious plants